Montreux III is a live album by jazz pianist Bill Evans with bassist Eddie Gómez, recorded at the Montreux Jazz Festival in Switzerland in 1975 and released on the Fantasy label. The album was the third of Evans' Montreux concert recordings to be released, following Montreux II (1970) and the Grammy Award-winning Bill Evans at the Montreux Jazz Festival (1968).

Reception
The Allmusic review by Scott Yanow awarded the album 4 stars and stated, "the communication between the two masterful players is quite special".

Track listing
 "Elsa" (Earl Zindars) - 7:28
 "Milano" (John Lewis) - 4:40
 "Venutian Rhythm Dance" (Clive Stevens) - 4:27
 "Django" (Lewis) - 6:08
 "Minha (All Mine)" (Francis Hime) - 4:11
 "Driftin'" (Dan Haerle) - 5:12
 "I Love You" (Cole Porter) - 6:38
 "The Summer Knows" (Alan Bergman, Marilyn Bergman, Michel Legrand) - 3:24

Personnel
Bill Evans - piano, electric piano
Eddie Gómez - bass

References

Bill Evans live albums
Albums recorded at the Montreux Jazz Festival
1975 live albums
Fantasy Records live albums